Anniyur Agnipureeswarar Temple
(அன்னியூர் அக்கினிபுரீஸ்வரர் கோயில்) is a Hindu temple located at Vanniyur in Tiruvarur district, Tamil Nadu, India. The presiding deity is Shiva. He is called as Agnipureeswarar. His consort is known as Gowri Parvathi.

Significance 
It is one of the shrines of the 275 Paadal Petra Sthalams - Shiva Sthalams glorified in the early medieval Tevaram poems by Tamil Saivite Nayanar Tirunavukkarasar.

Literary mention 
Tirunavukkarasar describes the feature of the deity as:

References

External links 
 
 

Shiva temples in Tiruvarur district
Padal Petra Stalam